Mohamed Bensalam was the Algerian minister for tourism in the 1995 government of Mokdad Sifi.

References 

Living people
Year of birth missing (living people)
Algerian politicians
21st-century Algerian people